Laval-d'Aix is a commune in the Drôme department in southeastern France.

Population

See also
Communes of the Drôme department
Parc naturel régional du Vercors

References

Communes of Drôme